Mozart's Money is the third album by folk artist Hugh Blumenfeld. It was released in 1996 by Prime CD.

Track listing
"Mozart's Money" – 3:15
"Raphael" – 3:48
"Waiting for the Good Humour Man" – 2:28
"This Mountain" – 3:44
"Talking Island" – 2:05
"Mr. Rain" – 3:22
"Main Street Sky" – 3:54
"What If You Do Nothing"/"Winter Suite" – 2:46
"Sweet October" – 1:18
"Sparrowhawk" – 4:11
"Blizzard" – 4:28
"Friends of a Traveler" – 4:20
"Visit" – 2:00
(Data Track) – 2:01
"When Hiroshima Comes To Disneyland" (Hidden Track) – 2:48

Personnel
Hugh Blumenfeld - Guitar, Main Performer, Vocals
Dennis McDermott - Drums
Marshall Rosenberg - Percussion
David Seitz - Producer, Mixing, Engineer
Michael Visceglia - Bass
Judith Zweiman - Vocals
Mark Saunders - ?, Text Layout
Gideon Freudmann - Cello
Jeff Colchamiro - Assistant Engineer, Mixing Assistant
Andrea Ginaes - Photography
Ray Martin - Mixing
Lucy Kaplansky - Vocals
Jack Bashkow - Sax (Alto)
Mark Dann - Bass, Guitar
David Hamburger - Pedal Steel
Margo Hennebach - Piano
Mindy Jostyn - Harmonica
Bill Kollar - Mastering

Hugh Blumenfeld albums
1996 albums